Mount Merriam is a prominent 5,083-foot (1,549-meter) mountain summit located in Glacier Bay National Park and Preserve, in the Alsek Ranges of the Saint Elias Mountains, in southeast Alaska. Although modest in elevation, relief is significant as the mountain rises up from tidewater in less than three miles, and it ranks 85th in prominence for all peaks in Alaska. 
The mountain was named by members of a 1941 Glacier Bay expedition for Dr. Clinton Hart Merriam (1855-1942), Chief of the U.S. Department of Agriculture (USDA) Biological Survey. Merriam was a zoologist for the 1899 Harriman Alaska expedition which explored Glacier Bay. Weather permitting, Mount Merriam can be seen from Glacier Bay, which is a popular destination for cruise ships. The months May through June offer the most favorable weather for viewing or climbing the peak.

Climate

Based on the Köppen climate classification, Mount Merriam Peak has a subarctic climate with cold, snowy winters, and mild summers. Weather systems coming off the Gulf of Alaska are forced upwards by the Saint Elias Mountains (orographic lift), causing heavy precipitation in the form of rainfall and snowfall. Temperatures can drop below −20 °C with wind chill factors below −30 °C. This climate supports several hanging glaciers on its slopes including the Twin Glacier just south of the summit. Precipitation runoff from the mountain and meltwater from the glaciers drains into Glacier Bay Basin.

See also
List of mountain peaks of Alaska
Geography of Alaska

References

External links
 Weather forecast: Mount Merriam

Merriam
Merriam
Merriam
Merriam
Merriam